(The) King of Comedy may refer to:

People
 Jerry Lewis (1926–2017), American comedian, actor, writer and director. Nicknamed for his role in the 1982 Martin Scorsese film of the same name
 Dolphy (1928–2012), Filipino actor known as the "Comedy King" in the Philippines.
 Mack Sennett (1880–1960), nicknamed the King of Comedy

Film
 The King of Comedy (film), a 1982 film starring Robert De Niro and Jerry Lewis
 The Original Kings of Comedy, a 2000 Spike Lee film
 The Original Latin Kings of Comedy, a 2002 Jeb Brien film
 King of Comedy (film), a 1999 Hong Kong Television Broadcast film starring Stephen Chow

Song
 "King of Comedy" (song), a song by R.E.M. on their album Monster

See also 
 Kings of Comedy (disambiguation)
 Joker (2019 film), inspired by Martin Scorsese's 1982 film The King of Comedy

